The 3rd constituency of Jura is a French legislative constituency in the Jura département.

Description

The 3rd constituency of Jura covers the north of the department and includes its largest town Dole.

Whilst now held comfortably by the UMP the seat has historically swung between left and right. Between 1997 and 2002 the seat was held by Dominique Voynet the Green candidate in the 2007 French presidential election.

Deputies

Election results

2022 

 
 
|-
| colspan="8" bgcolor="#E9E9E9"|
|-
 
 

 
 
 
 
 

* El Mezoughi stood as a dissident PS member, without the support of the party or the NUPES alliance.

2017

2012

Sources

Official results of French elections from 2002: "Résultats électoraux officiels en France" (in French).

3